Milanów  is a village in Parczew County, Lublin Voivodeship, in eastern Poland. It is the seat of the gmina (administrative district) called Gmina Milanów.

The village has a population of 1,105.

References

Villages in Parczew County
Siedlce Governorate
Lublin Governorate
Lublin Voivodeship (1919–1939)